List of candidates in the 2021 Kerala Legislative Assembly election from the three major alliances namely the candidates from the Left Democratic Front (LDF), United Democratic Front (UDF) and National Democratic Alliance (NDA) are listed in the table below.

The performance of candidates from major alliances is available in table format at Performance of candidates from major alliances of the 2021 Kerala Legislative Assembly election.

Many parties, including the CPI-M, the INC and the CPI, did not give seats to most sitting candidates who had already served two terms. A third of selected candidates had prior experience in local bodies. The Indian Union Muslim League fielded a female candidate - Noorbeena Rasheed (Kozhikode South) - for the first time in 25 years. Anannyah Kumari Alex (Vengara) became the first transgender candidate to run for the Kerala Legislative Assembly, but later suspended her campaign after alleged harassment from her party members. The Election Commission turned down the nomination papers of BJP candidates in Thalassery, Guruvayur, and the AIADMK candidate in Devikulam as their nominations were incomplete.

References

State Assembly elections in Kerala
2020s in Kerala